Koreana, formerly known as Arirang Singers, are a South Korean band. They were formed in 1962 and started being popular internationally after they released their debut album DisCorea on Polydor label in 1979. The single "Dark Eyes" from the eponymous album was a big hit. After the great success, they continued to release more albums: Burning Fantasy (1980) and Highlights (Too Much Love) (1983). They are best known for playing "Hand In Hand", the official song of the Seoul 1988 Summer Olympics, sung in both Korean and English. The song was released as a single with "Victory" as its B-side, and became a hit. The band followed up with another charting single, "Living For Love", with B-side "One In A Million".

Long-time group member Jerry Lee Yong-Gyu died in early 2021 of cancer.

Members

Classic Lineup
 Cathy Lee Oea-Sook - vocals, keyboard, piano, electronic drums, tambourine, guitar
 Marie Hong Hwa-Ja - vocals, bass guitar, keyboard, keytar, electronic drums
 Tom Lee Seung-Kyu - vocals, guitar, saxophone, flute, trumpet, trombone
 Jerry Lee Yong-Gyu - vocals, electronic drums, percussion, trumpet (Died: 2021)

Past Members
 Sam Hong Sin-Yun
 Michel Hong Yun-Shik
 Annie Hong Young-Hee

Discography

Albums 
 1979: DisCorea
 1980: Burning Fantasy
 1983: Highlights (Too Much Love)
 1988: Hand In Hand
 1990: Living For Love
 1993: Expo '93
 1996: We Are One

Singles 
 1978: "I Love Rock'n Roll Music" b/w "Song Of Arirang"
 1979: "Dark Eyes" b/w "Troubles"
 1986: "Hey Daydreamer/Don't Make Me Cry" b/w "Midnight Lover" (12" Maxi)
 1988: "Hand In Hand"
 1988: "Loving You, Loving Me"
 1990: "Living For Love"
 1992: "Sail Into The Sunset"

References

South Korean musical groups
1988 Summer Olympics